Minxiong Township or Minsyong Township is a rural township in Chiayi County, Taiwan.

Geography
The population of Minxiong Township is 70,316 (as of May 2022). It is the most populous district of Chiayi County. Minxiong Township consists of 28 villages with total area of 85.4969 km2.  

Mixiong Township is located on Chianan Plain with low hills in its eastern part. The climate is humid and hot.

Administrative divisions
Tungrong, Zhongle, Xian, Liaoding, Fuquan, Tunghu, Dinglun, Jingpu, Zhonghe, Pinghe, Xichang, Lishou, Sanxing, Tungxing, Zengbei, Beidou, Shuangfu, Fule, Daqi, Xiulin, Songshan, Xingzhong, Xingnan, Jinxing, Fuxing, Wenlong, Shanzhong and Zhongyang Village.

Education
 National Chiayi University - Minxiong Campus
 National Chung Cheng University
 WuFeng University

Infrastructure
 Chiahui Power Plant

Tourist attractions
 Alcohol Cultural Relics Museum
 Baolin Temple
 Chiayi Performing Arts Center
 Dashihye Temple
 Liou's Ancient House
 National Radio Museum

Transportation

 TRA Minxiong Station

Notable natives
 Huang Chu-wen, Minister of Interior (1998-2000)

External links

 Minsyong Township Office

Townships in Chiayi County